Blackwood Interchange is a bus station located in the town centre of Blackwood, Caerphilly, South Wales. It is situated on Gordon Road adjacent to the High Street.

Background 
The existing Blackwood Bus Station redeveloped by Caerphilly County Borough Council in 2007. The project cost an approximate £2.4 million.

During development, traders in the town centre voiced concerns that "customers will be put off walking through the market when contractors move in" however Councillors reassured concerned individuals with the prospect of a reduction in the business rate for affected businesses.

Architect Geraint Jones, unusually, was an internal developer from within Caerphilly Council's own department, at a time where most civic developments in the UK are designed by private practices.

The redevelopment of Blackwood Bus Station was judged by Caerphilly Council as successful, helping to end the anti social behaviour associated with the previous concrete structure station, and it has encouraged the subsequent development of the town in the form of new retail units on its periphery and the new Sirhowy Enterprise Way area.

Awards 
The 2007 redevelopment won a number of awards nationally, including:

 Welsh Local Government Association Building of the Year 2007 (at the time named the Consortium of Local Authorities in Wales)
 RICS Wales Regeneration Award 2008
 ICE Wales Roy Edwards Award 2008

Layout 
The bus station is a glass façade terminal building including café, waiting area, canteen, offices and welfare facilities.

The stand doors provide access to buses, which park next to the gate on arrival, and then reverse out on departure. It is fully covered from the weather.

The station offers a café, named The Plaza, and used to offer public toilet facilities within the station building. The toilet facilities closed in April 2019 due to the increasing financial difficulties faced by Caerphilly Council. Caerphilly Town Centre public toilets re-opened in July 2019 but the fate of facilities in Blackwood remain uncertain. A proposed development, Blackwood Artisan Markets, and the accompanying apartment project, have offered to provide alternative toilets.

Destinations 

Blackwood lies as a stop on the Tredegar to Newport route, as well as offering a number of other destinations which begin in the town. These include Pontypridd, New Tredegar, Abertillery, Cardiff, and Ystrad Mynach with transfer for the railway station.

Rail transport 
Blackwood railway station closed in 1965, however NAT bus 901 provides travel to nearby Ystrad Mynach railway station in 16 minutes, every hour.

Professor Mark Barry, who has consulted the Welsh Government on the South Wales Metro project, has written about the potential for Blackwood railway station to reopen as part of a tram-train system connecting other valleys towns from east to west.

References 

Buildings and structures in Caerphilly County Borough
Bus stations in Wales